The Cameroon Baptist Convention  is a Baptist Christian denomination in Cameroon. It is affiliated with the Baptist World Alliance. The headquarters is in Bamenda.

History
The Convention had its origins in a mission of the Baptist Missionary Society in 1841 by English and Jamaican missionaries including Joseph Jackson Fuller and Joseph Merrick. In 1931, the mission was taken over by the North American Baptist Conference. In 1954, the Cameroon Baptist Convention was formally founded. According to a denomination census released in 2020, it claimed 228,655 members and 1,537 churches.

Schools
The convention has 19 primary schools, 12 secondary schools. 

It also has 4 professional training institutes.

It has 1 affiliated theological institute, the Cameroon Baptist Theological Seminary founded in 1947 in Ndu.

Health Services 
The convention has 8 hospitals and 34 health centers, gathered in the Cameroon Baptist Convention Health Services.

References

External links
 Official Website

Baptist denominations in Africa
Evangelicalism in Cameroon
Christian denominations in Cameroon